CBXT-DT (channel 5) is a CBC Television station in Edmonton, Alberta, Canada. It is part of a twinstick with Ici Radio-Canada Télé station CBXFT-DT (channel 11). Both stations share studios at the Edmonton City Centre (across from Churchill Square) in Downtown Edmonton, while CBXT-DT's transmitter is located on Wye Road in Sherwood Park.

History 
The station first went on the air on October 1, 1961 as Edmonton's second television station; the previous CBC affiliate, CFRN (channel 3), switched to the newly established CTV on the same day. Initially, it was branded as "CBXT 5", or "Channel 5". After being known as "Edmonton/5" in the late 1970s, it became known as "XTV" in 1980. It reverted to the "Edmonton 5" brand in the mid-1980s and then, on January 1, 1986, became "CBC Television Edmonton". Its local newscasts were originally known as Metro.

When CBXT signed on, it was the first television station in Canada to use television cameras that could be remotely controlled from a control room, and did not need constant adjustment. In 2004, the CBC's Edmonton operations moved into a new digital broadcast facility downtown, bringing all operations of radio and television, under one roof. The new combined facility at the Edmonton City Centre totals . At the same time, master control was consolidated with those of CBRT in Calgary into a single facility presently based at the CBC Studios in Calgary.

When Red Deer's CKRD disaffiliated from CBC Television in 2005 (switching to E!, reverting to its original calls CHCA-TV), CBXT was given control of the transmitter in Coronation, Alberta (CKRD-1) on channel 10. CBXT added a transmitter on channel 22 in Red Deer, broadcasting the full CBXT/CBC schedule to Red Deer and Central Alberta.

News operation 
CBXT airs 12 hours of local news programming; in regards to the number of hours devoted to news programming, it is the lowest local newscast output out of any English-language television station in the Edmonton market.

CBC Edmonton News is broadcast live at 6 and 11 p.m. on weekdays from its studios at Edmonton City Centre Mall. Hourly 1-minute summaries at :59 past the hour are also produced by CBC Edmonton, and are broadcast in the afternoons and evenings.

In addition, the station produces a weekend provincial newscast for both CBC stations in Calgary and Edmonton. CBC Alberta News airs at 11:30 p.m. or following Hockey Night in Canada on Saturdays, and at 11 p.m. on Sundays.

The 11 p.m. edition of CBC Edmonton News, and the Saturday and Sunday editions of CBC Alberta News are simulcast on CBC North. Forecasts for Northwest Territories, Nunavut, and Yukon Territory are included in the weather segments.

CBXT also simulcasts Edmonton AM from CBX weekday mornings from 6–7 a.m. The radio program is presented with an enhanced news/weather/traffic ticker alongside live shots of its radio studio.

A weekly current affairs program, Our Edmonton also airs on weekend mornings.

As of May 22, 2017, CBXT began broadcasting all live TV news programming originating from its Edmonton studios using a control room in Toronto. The technical change has enabled the station to produce its local news in high-definition, the fourth and final station in Edmonton to do so.

Technical information

Subchannel

Analog-to-digital conversion
On April 1, 2011, CBXT began broadcasting its digital signal on UHF channel 42. On August 31, 2011, when Canadian television stations in CRTC-designated mandatory markets transitioned from analog to digital broadcasts, the station's digital signal remained on UHF channel 42. Through the use of PSIP, digital television receivers will display CBXT's virtual channel as 5.1. On March 20, 2021, CBXT-DT changed its frequency to channel 25.

Transmitters 
CBXT had nearly 30 rebroadcasters in certain Central and Northern Albertan communities. Due to federal funding reductions to the CBC, in April 2012, the CBC responded with substantial budget cuts, which included shutting down CBC's and Radio-Canada's remaining transmitters on July 31, 2012. None of CBC or Radio-Canada's television rebroadcasters were converted to digital, leaving those areas dependent on cable television to receive CBC Television programming.

Former transmitters

References

External links 
CBC Edmonton

BXT-DT
BXT-DT
Television channels and stations established in 1961
1961 establishments in Alberta